A blue team is a group of individuals who perform an analysis of information systems to ensure security, identify security flaws, verify the effectiveness of each security measure, and to make certain all security measures will continue to be effective after implementation.

History
As part of the United States computer security defense initiative, red teams were developed to exploit other malicious entities that would do them harm. As a result, blue teams were developed to design defensive measures against such red team activities.

Incident response
If an incident does occur within the organization, the blue team will perform the following six steps to handle the situation:

Preparation
Identification
Containment
Eradication
Recovery
Lessons learned

Operating system hardening
In preparation for a computer security incident, the blue team will perform hardening techniques on all operating systems throughout the organization.

Perimeter defense
The blue team must always be mindful of the network perimeter, including traffic flow, packet filtering, proxy firewalls, and intrusion detection systems.

Tools 
Blue teams employ a wide range of tools allowing them to detect an attack, collect forensic data, perform data analysis and make changes to threat future attacks and mitigate threats. The tools include:

Log management and analysis 
 AlienVault
 FortiSIEM (a.k.a. AccelOps)
 Graylog
 InTrust
 LogRhythm
 Microsoft Sentinel
 NetWitness
 Qradar (IBM)
 Rapid7
 SIEMonster
 SolarWinds
 Splunk

Security information and event management (SIEM) technology 
SIEM software supports threat detection and security incident response by performing real-time data collection and analysis of security events. This type of software also uses data sources outside of the network including indicators of compromise (IoC) threat intelligence.

See also
 List of digital forensics tools
 Vulnerability management
 White hat (computer security)
 Red team

References

Computer security